Certosa di Pavia (Pavese dialect: Certusa dè Pavia or la Certùsa) is a town and comune (municipality) in the province of Pavia, Lombardy. It is named after the Certosa di Pavia, a large monastery around which the town grew up. As of 2013 its population was of 5,114.

History
The comune was created in 1929 by the former communes of Torre del Mangano, Torriano and Borgarello (which became again autonomous in 1958).

Geography
The municipality is located north of Pavia and 30 km south of Milan. It borders with the municipalities of Borgarello, Giussago, Marcignago, Pavia and Vellezzo Bellini. Its territory is formed by the hamlets (frazioni) of Cascine Calderari, Samperone, Torre del Mangano (municipal seat) and Torriano.

Demographics

Gallery

See also
Certosa di Pavia Monastery
Certosa di Pavia railway station

References

External links

 Certosa di Pavia official website

Populated places established in 1929